Leonard Johnrose (29 November 1969 – 15 August 2022) was an English professional footballer who played for clubs including Burnley, Bury and Swansea City. He was a defensive midfielder.

Career
Johnrose began his career at Blackburn Rovers as a young trainee, and also spent time on loan at Preston North End. During these spells he impressed to a level where he was signed for £50,000 by Hartlepool United. He went on to make over fifty appearances for the club, scoring eleven goals in the process. At the end of his contract, he was signed by Bury manager Stan Ternent who wanted to add some toughness to his central midfield.

Johnrose was a central character in Bury's rapid rise to the First Division. Ternent saw the midfielder as so important to his sides that he paid £225,000 to take Johnrose with him to his new club, Burnley. At the end of the 2002–03 season he was released on a free transfer, but re-signed for the club four months later on a week-to-week basis. Later he re-signed for another of his old clubs, Bury. After three months he again moved, this time to Swansea City.

Johnrose helped Swansea City avoid relegation from the Third Division out of the Football League, scoring three crucial goals that season. Two goals in one week in March helped earn an away draw at Kidderminster and a home victory against Oxford. His final, and most crucial goal in a Swansea shirt, came on the final Saturday of the 2002–2003 season. Swansea City had to equal or better Exeter's result against Southend in their game at the Vetch Field versus Hull City in order to preserve their league status. Johnrose poked home from close range from a Roberto Martinez free-kick early in the second half to put the Swans 3–2 and send a packed Vetch Field into raptures. The Swans won 4–2 and preserved their league status at the expense of Exeter.

In the summer of 2003, Johnrose was offered a 12-month contract with Swansea, and started the 2003–2004 season in the unfamiliar role of centre-half. After recovering from a hamstring injury, Johnrose briefly became captain and reverted to his more familiar defensive central midfield role. Around Christmas 2003, a further 12-month contract extension at the end of that season was discussed, but when manager Brian Flynn left the club by mutual consent in March 2004, Johnrose had his contract paid up and left the Swans within two days.

Johnrose signed for Burnley for a third time on transfer deadline day (March 2004).

Personal life
After retiring, Johnrose became a teacher. In March 2017, he was diagnosed with motor neurone disease.

After Johnrose went public about his condition and personal battle with motor neurone disease, Gareth Winston and Lee Trundle organised a team of Swansea legends to take part in a game which ended with a 10–7 win for the legends. He died on 15 August 2022, at the age of 52.

References

Further reading

External links
 
 
 

1969 births
2022 deaths
Black British sportspeople
English footballers
Footballers from Preston, Lancashire
Association football midfielders
English Football League players
Blackburn Rovers F.C. players
Preston North End F.C. players
Hartlepool United F.C. players
Bury F.C. players
Burnley F.C. players
Swansea City A.F.C. players
Deaths from motor neuron disease
Wheelchair users